Bahram Arif oglu Bagirzade (born September 4, 1972 in Baku, Azerbaijan) is a TV host, actor, comedian and film director.

Biography 
In 1994, he graduated from Azerbaijan State University with a degree in filmmaking. Worked three years in a psychological hospital.  From 1992 to 2001 was a member of the Parni iz Baku team of the Russian TV show KVN.

He was diagnosed with COVID-19 on June 7, 2020. His situation became critical on June 14, 2020. He has since made a full recovery.

Personal life 
He is married, has two children and currently resides in Baku, Azerbaijan. Bagirzade is an avid fan of Neftchi Baku and a cartoonist.

Films

Actor 
 1995: Morning
 1997: All goes to good (Hər şey yaxşılığa doğru)
 1999: Between land and sky (Yerlə göy arasında)
 2001: Dream (Yuxu)
 2004: National Bomb (Milli bomba)
 2006: Examination (Yoxlama)
 2007: Once in Caucasus (Bir dəfə Qafqazda)
 2008: Halal Money (Halal pullar)
 2010: Person (Adam)
 2011: Where's the lawyer? (Vəkil hanı?)
 2012-2014: 3 Sisters (3 bacı)
 2013: Fear not, I'm with you! 1919 (Qorxma, mən səninləyəm! 1919)
 2014: Last stop (Axırıncı dayanacaq)
 2015: 100 Papers (100 kağız)
 2015: The yard (Həyət)
 2017: Aghanatig (Ağanatiq)
 2018: The Engagement Ring 2 (Bəxt üzüyü 2)

References

External links
 Bahram's Official Site
 Bahram's Sport Blog

1972 births
Living people
KVN
Azerbaijani comedians
Azerbaijani cartoonists
Azerbaijani caricaturists
Azerbaijan State University of Culture and Arts alumni
Film people from Baku
Entertainers from Baku